The 2009–10 season was Iraklis 29th consecutive (and 50th in total) season in the Super League Greece.

Transfers

In

Out

Club

Management

Kit

|
|
|

Other information

Pre-season and friendlies

Super League Greece

League table

Results summary

Results by round

Matches

Greek Cup

Matches

Player statistics
¹ Denotes player has left the club in the January transfer window. ² Denotes player joined in the January transfer window.

References

Iraklis
Iraklis Thessaloniki F.C. seasons